Kanjar Ro is a supervillain appearing in comic books published by DC Comics.

Publication history
He first appeared in Justice League of America #3 (February 1961) in the story "The Slave Ship of Space", and was created by Gardner Fox and Mike Sekowsky.

Fictional character biography
Kanjar Ro is the dictator of the planet Dhor in the Antares star system. Dhor is constantly at war with three other Antarean worlds: Alstair, ruled by the plant-like Queen Hyathis; Mosteel, ruled by the metal-skinned Kromm; and Llarr, ruled by the lizard-like Emperor Sayyar. In his first appearance, he enslaves the Justice League with his Gamma Gong, and uses them to battle the other three monarchs by threatening to leave all humanity in a paralyzed state, to only be released if all three monarchs spoke Kanjar Ro's name at the same time. The League is able to defeat all three monarchs, and also defeat him, despite him taking away the monarchs' voices with his energi-rod (the League had recorded their voices so humanity was freed). The JLA imprisons all four monarchs on a small planet around which Green Lantern creates a power ring barrier.

Ro escapes after the four villains make a crack in the barrier with their thought waves, but leaves the other three behind. Ro makes several attempts to conquer Rann, prompting the League to team-up with Adam Strange. He first uses radiation from Rann's Triple-Star to become three times as powerful as Superman and nearly defeats the JLA, but Adam defeats him with his own Dhorite Energi-rod (like Superman is weakened by Kryptonite, Kanjar is vulnerable to Dhorite) and imprisons Ro in a prison with bars of Dhorite. For some reason the yellow radiation he released means Adam cannot stay on Rann for more than a year. While the people of the planet Rann are distracted, Kanjar Ro creates a duplicate of himself from his own aura and leaves it in his place. He then uses the auras of the Flash, Wonder Woman, Green Lantern, the Atom, and Aquaman to create doubles to draw the other members of the Justice League into various traps which Kanjar Ro has devised. The real members of the JLA are able to spot the duplicates as they do not have the same weaknesses or personalities as the real JLA members. Kanjor Ro's duplicate, upset at being left behind, reveals the real Ro's plan to the JLA, who return the camouflaged Earth back to its proper location and re-imprison the real Ro.

Following the Crisis on Infinite Earths Kanjar Ro is reintroduced in Hawkworld as a plotting bureaucrat in the Thanagarian Ministry of Alien Affairs.  This was originally intended to take place prior to JLA #3, but is later revealed to occur in the present. Ro's pre-Crisis background still exists, however, as his Gamma Gong is kept in the Justice League Watchtower's trophy room.

Kanjar Ro subsequently appears in both Superman and JLA (vol. 3) attempting to conquer planets through force or guile. Kanjar Ro's sister, Kanjar Ru, appears in Valor as the warden of the Starlag II prison. Kanjar Ro is mentioned in Justice League of America #4 in passing by Black Lightning. He later appears in Justice League of America #19 on the planet Cygnus 4019, the intended prison planet for Earth's supervillains. After attempting to capture the League (who had come to check on the prisoners) he reveals that he planned to take control of the villains upon their arrival, only for their teleport beams to be redirected elsewhere.

Kanjar Ro appears in Trinity, having disguised himself as Despero to take his place in a ritual that takes the positions of "keystones of the universe" from Superman, Batman, and Wonder Woman. Although the ritual is successful, granting Morgaine le Fey and Enigma great power, Kanjar gains nothing, due to his deception. Revealed as a fake, Kanjar flees Morgaine and Enigma, but is confronted by a vengeful Despero. He barters the location of the imprisoned Crime Syndicate of Amerika in exchange for leniency; after this, he is ignored when he demands vengeance against Morgaine, and is taken to Krona's polar base, from where he radios for the heroes to save himself from the destruction Krona prepares for Earth. In the end, as the Green Lanterns take custody of Despero's massive alien armada, he reveals he has copied Krona's files and notes and is ready to sell them to the highest bidder. He is last seen ready to sneak away from the fleet en route to the prison planet Takron-Galtos.

Kanjar Ro is later seen in the Oan prison cells, and is present during a mass breakout. Unwilling to be killed by the rioting prisoners, Kanjar bargains with Kyle Rayner, offering to help quell the riot in exchange for leniency on his sentence. This pact later saves Kanjar's life; Guardians had ordered the Alpha Lanterns to kill all the escaped prisoners, and Kyle is able to convince the Guardians to spare Kanjar by citing his assistance during the riot.

After presumably being released from Oa, Kanjar Ro returns to Dhor and resumes his rule of the planet just as Starro the Conqueror begins his latest conquest. Vril Dox erects a forcefield barrier, stopping the spread of Starro's invasion, but also trapping a number of planets with the Star Conqueror, Dhor and Kanjar Ro included. Kanjar Ro is seen telling Dox he "will consider" Dox's request for his assistance in stopping Starro.  After ending their communication, several members of Vril Dox's R.E.B.E.L.S. team speculate that Kanjar Ro is more likely to cut a deal with Starro to save himself rather than throw in with Dox. However, Kanjar Ro seeks the R.E.B.E.L.S.' help when Starro's horde begin their invasion of Dhor, and is denied by the Dominator Xylon. When Kanjar tries to use his gamma gong against the horde, Starro's general Smite shatters it to pieces. As Smite is about to kill Kanjar, Adam Strange, who had just heeded Dox's call for help, zeta-beams himself and Kanjar away to the R.E.B.E.L.S.' temporary base.  It is revealed that Dox had originally sent Strange to retrieve the gamma gong, not its inventor, who Dox described as a "dithering idiot". Nevertheless, Kanjar Ro is currently a member of the R.E.B.E.L.S. team.

Powers and abilities
Kanjar Ro is a cunning strategist and relies on advanced alien weaponry. He carries an Energi-Rod that allows him to levitate and communicate through hyper-space.

Other versions
 Kanjar Ro appears in Justice League Unlimited #4.
 In Green Lantern comics, an alien race called the Laroo have a distinct likeness to Kanjar Ro except they are blue.
 The 1980s series Captain Carrot and His Amazing Zoo Crew presented the parallel Earth of "Earth-C-Minus", a world populated by talking animal superheroes that paralleled the mainstream DC Universe. Kanjar Ro had an Earth-C-Minus counterpart named "Kangar-Roo", an alien kangaroo who battled his universe's heroic Just'a Lotta Animals, paralleling the story seen in Justice League of America (volume 1) #3.
 In the League of Extraordinary Gentlemen volume 3 backup feature, Minions of the Moon, the Galley-Wag escaped from slavery aboard a space ship propelled by oar-like devices, similar to Kanjar Ro's in his first appearance. His captors are said to come from Antares, and are described as pink-skinned with compound eyes and wearing short shorts. One is named Kelger Vo.

JLA/Avengers
Kanjar Ro is among the enthralled villains defending Krona's stronghold in #4. He is shown fighting Yellowjacket.

In other media

Television

 Kanjar Ro appears in the Justice League episode "In Blackest Night", voiced by René Auberjonois. 
 Kanjar Ro appears in Batman: The Brave and the Bold, voiced by Marc Worden. In his most notable appearance in the episode "The Rise of the Blue Beetle!", he captures Gribbles to use them as fuel. When Batman and Blue Beetle arrive to stop him, he uses a sonic wave-emitting Gamma Gong to separate the latter from his scarab and bond with it until Jaime uses the gong himself to defeat him. In subsequent appearances, Ro fights Batman, among other heroes, alongside space pirates and an army of robots before he is eventually eaten by an alien creature while attempting to destroy the planet Rann.
 Kanjar Ro appears in the Justice League Action episode "All Aboard the Space Train", voiced by Khary Payton.

Film
Kanjar Ro appears in Green Lantern: First Flight, voiced by Kurtwood Smith. This version has squid-like facial features and an insectoid body with wings. He joins forces with Sinestro to obtain the "yellow element" and have the Weaponers of Qward convert it into a Power Ring for the latter. After doing so, Sinestro kills Ro and frames Hal Jordan for it before briefly resurrecting Ro to learn where Qward is. Ro's corpse is subsequently incinerated in a battle between Kilowog and Jordan against Sinestro's accomplice Boodikka.

References

7. DC's Legends of Tomorrow season 1 episode 7 Rip Hunter signals his ship to perform pre-planned maneuvers using the phrase 'Kanjar Ro'.

External links
 Toon Zone: Kanjar Ro
 DCU Guide: Kanjar Ro chronology

Fictional mass murderers
Space pirates
DC Comics aliens
DC Comics extraterrestrial supervillains
DC Comics male supervillains
DC Comics supervillains
Fictional dictators
Comics characters introduced in 1961
Fictional pirates
Characters created by Gardner Fox
Characters created by Mike Sekowsky